Life 101 is a 1995 direct-to-video comedy-drama film, starring Corey Haim, Keith Coogan and Ami Dolenz.

Plot summary
A college freshman Ramsy experiences love for the first time in the 1960s when he asks out Joy.

Cast 

 Corey Haim as Ramsy
 Ami Dolenz as Joy
 Keith Coogan as Buck
 Louis Mandylor as Donnie
 Kyle Cody as Lance
 Skip Schwink as Ryan Hall Dormmate
 Tim Kahle as Ryan Hall Dormmate
 Martin Dorden as Ryan Hall Dormmate

Filming locations
Filmed at the University of Maryland, College Park.

References

External links
 

1995 direct-to-video films
1990s coming-of-age comedy-drama films
1995 independent films
1995 films
American coming-of-age comedy-drama films
1990s English-language films
Films set in the 1960s
American independent films
1990s American films